Paraibinha River may refer to:

 Paraibinha River (Alagoas), Brazil
 Paraibinha River (Paraíba), a river of Paraíba, Brazil

See also
 Parnaìbinha River, a river of Maranhão, Brazil